Johnnie S. Aikens (September 11, 1914 – January 5, 1986) was a Democratic politician who served in the Missouri House of Representatives. Born in Cotton Plant, Arkansas, he was first elected to the Missouri House of Representatives in 1966.

References

Members of the Missouri House of Representatives
1914 births
1986 deaths
People from Cotton Plant, Arkansas
20th-century American politicians